Lazarovci  is a village in the municipality of Kičevo, North Macedonia. It used to be part of the former Oslomej Municipality.

Demographics
As of the 2021 census, Lazarovci had ninety (90) residents with the following ethnic composition:
Macedonians: 50
Albanians: 35
Serbs: 1
Persons for whom data are taken from administrative sources 4

References

External links

Villages in Kičevo Municipality
Albanian communities in North Macedonia